Flora Saini, also known by her screen name Asha Saini, is an Indian actress and model. She predominantly works in Bollywood, and also appeared in a number of Kannada, Tamil and Telugu 
films. Since her debut in Prema Kosam (1999), she has acted in over 50 films and co-starred with noted actors like Rajinikanth, Balakrishna, Siddhant, Sudeep, Shivarajkumar, Vijaykanth, Prabhu, Karthik, Jagapati Babu and Rajasekhar.

Early life 
Born in Chandigarh to an army officer, Flora began her schooling in Udhampur, Jammu and Kashmir. She continued her education in the Army Public School, Dhaula Kuan, Delhi. Her family then moved to Kolkata, where she started pursuing a modeling career. She participated in the Miss Kolkata beauty pageant.

Career 
Flora made her acting debut in the 1999 Telugu film Prema Kosam. The producer of the film rechristened her as Asha Saini; some years later she would adopt a new screen name, Mayuri, as per the advice of an astrologer, before eventually reverting to her original name.

The actress subsequently played supporting roles in more than a dozen Telugu-language films in the next three years. She appeared in the film Narasimha Naidu (2002), which went on to become highly successful. It was for some time the most notable film in her filmography, and it led to her being referred to as "Lux Papa" thereafter. In 2002, Flora made her first Hindi-language film, starring in the T. P. Aggarwal-produced Bharat Bhagya Vidhata. Her second Hindi film, Love in Nepal (2004), also produced by Agarwal, saw her paired with popular playback singer Sonu Nigam.

Flora has appeared in several Kannada-language films, too, including Giri, starring Srinagara Kitty, and Nammannna, starring Sudeep.

In March 2008, she was arrested in Chennai for supposedly having forged visa documents, and was subsequently banned from the Tamil film industry. She claimed innocence, and the ban was lifted a couple of weeks later.

Three films in which Flora Saini stars – the Telugu-language Broker, and two Kannada-language films, Vismaya Pramaya and Vah Re Vah – were released on 31 December 2010, a rare occurrence that secured her an entry in the Limca Book of Records for the most film releases on one day. In 2010, Flora Saini was honoured with the Uttarakhand Ratna Award. She has also received The Great Daughter of Soil Award in Mauritius for her anti-poverty work there.

She is last seen in a web-series called Gandii Baat season 2 with Anveshi Jain, where she played a lead role. Recently, Saini was seen in many web series and notably worked in Mayanagari-City of Dreams of Hotstar.

In 2015, Flora Saini played the role of Muskan in MSG: The Messenger starring Gurmeet Ram Rahim. She played the role of a daughter with Jayshree Soni as Kasam and Olexandra Semen as Alice.

In October 2019 Flora Saini made her debut in Bengali web series through Dupur Thakurpo hoichoi web series. It was the 3rd season of the series and she played the iconinc role of Phulwa boudi.

She also was chosen as a face of short video app "Firework", while being managed by "Celeb Connex".

Filmography

Films

Television

Web series 
All web series are in Hindi language, otherwise noted the language.

References

External links 

 
 

Actresses in Tamil cinema
Actresses in Telugu cinema
Female models from Chandigarh
Actresses from Chandigarh
Living people
Actresses in Hindi cinema
Actresses in Kannada cinema
Indian film actresses
20th-century Indian actresses
21st-century Indian actresses
Actresses in Punjabi cinema
1978 births